is a Japanese former weightlifter who won a bronze medal in 1968 Summer Olympics, bronze medals in the 1965, 1966, and 1968 World Championships, gold medals in the 1969 and 1971 World Championships, and a gold medal in the 1970 Asian Games.
At the 2012 Summer Olympics his daughter Hiromi Miyake won a silver medal in Weightlifting in the 48kg category.

He a retired Japan Ground Self-Defense Force Colonel.

Yoshinobu Miyake is his Brother.

References

1945 births
Living people
Japanese male weightlifters
Japan Ground Self-Defense Force personnel
Olympic weightlifters of Japan
Weightlifters at the 1968 Summer Olympics
Olympic bronze medalists for Japan
Olympic medalists in weightlifting
Asian Games medalists in weightlifting
Weightlifters at the 1970 Asian Games
Medalists at the 1968 Summer Olympics
Asian Games gold medalists for Japan
Medalists at the 1970 Asian Games
World Weightlifting Championships medalists
20th-century Japanese people
21st-century Japanese people